Our Lady of Perpetual Succour School (PS) is a Catholic girls' school located in Cairo, Egypt, Heliopolis region. Principal is sœur Takla Abo El-Way

Campus 

The school's sports facilities include a court where different sports can be played. Also a church, a mosque,a theatre, where Arabic and English plays and shows are presented. Students of all ages are allowed to perform. Shweekar and Elham Shahin - the famous actresses - attended school there.

Curriculum 

Our Lady of Perpetual Succour School used to be a French school under the name of École Notre-Dame du Perpétuel Secours. English used to be the second language. For now there isn't a French branch. A new branch is under establishment in The Second District New Heliopolis City.

Schools in Cairo